Ayllón is a municipality located in the province of Segovia, Castile and León, Spain. According to the 2019 census (INE), the municipality had a population of 1,196 inhabitants.

In 1411 a treaty, known as the Treaty of Ayllón, was signed between Portugal and Castile ending the wars of the Interregnum.

References

External links 
 Web about Ayllón in Barcelona's Poble Espanyol (in Spanish, Catalan, English, French, Portuguese, Italian, Galician and Romanian).

Municipalities in the Province of Segovia